The Finlay Limestone is a geologic formation in western Texas, southern New Mexico, and northern Chihuahua. It preserves fossils dating back to the early Cretaceous period.

Description
It is exposed in the Finlay Mountains, the Sierra de Juarez, and the Cerro de Cristo Rey uplift. The formation overlies the Cox Sandstone and is overlain by the Del Norte Formation.

Fossils
The formation is highly fossiliferous, containing fossils characteristic of early Cretaceous Albian and Comanchean age.

Economic resources
The formation includes carbonate replacement deposits of lead, zinc, and silver in northern Mexico, along the Chihuahua CRD belt.

History of investigation
The formation was first defined by G.B. Richardson in 1904 and assigned to the Fredericksburg Group.

See also

 List of fossiliferous stratigraphic units in New Mexico
 Paleontology in New Mexico

Footnotes

References
 
 
 

Cretaceous formations of New Mexico